The Battle of the Valleys is an NCAA Division II football rivalry between the Grand Valley State University Lakers and the Saginaw Valley State University Cardinals which began in 1975. Both teams play in the GLIAC. Since 2003, the week leading up to the game has featured a fundraising competition between the two student bodies with proceeds being donated to local charities.
Grand Valley and Saginaw Valley have met four times in the NCAA Division II football playoffs. While not considered part of the rivalry series, both teams count these games in the all-time head-to-head records and are included below.

Fundraising Battle
Adding to the football rivalry which has existed since 1975, in 2003 an additional element was added to the Battle of the Valleys rivalry in the form of a fundraising competition between the two student bodies. Grand Valley won the initial fundraising battle, raising $8,500 for the Big Brothers Big Sisters of Western Michigan with Saginaw Valley raising $6,208 for the BBBS of Mid-Michigan. While Grand Valley leads the rivalry on the football field, Saginaw Valley leads in the fundraising rivalry 8–3. A traveling trophy, Victoria, accompanies the fundraising competition and the winner of the fundraising competition, announced during the football game, has possession of the trophy until the next Battle. The largest margin of victory was in 2012 when Saginaw Valley raised over $30,000 for the Great Lakes Miracle League versus Grand Valley's $1,100 for the Mental Health Foundation of West Michigan, and the closest margin of victory was in 2006 when Grand Valley raised $19,337 for Burton Middle School and Saginaw Valley raised $19,160 for Child and Family Services of Saginaw County. Saginaw Valley is currently on a seven-year winning streak in the fundraising battle. All told, over $400,000 has been raised in the history of the Battle by both schools combined. The winner of the fundraising battle has also won the football game on four occasions: 2004, 2006, 2007, and 2012.

Game results

Fundraising results

See also  
 List of NCAA college football rivalry games

References

College football rivalries in the United States
Grand Valley State Lakers football
Saginaw Valley State Cardinals football
1975 establishments in Michigan